The J. H. Patel cabinet was the Council of Ministers in the Indian state of Karnataka headed by Chief minister J. H. Patel that was formed after the 1994 Karnataka Legislative Assembly elections.

Cabinet ministers
 Siddaramaiah - Deputy Chief Minister, Minister for Finance, Planning (sacked on 22 July 1999)
 D. Manjunath - Minister for Revenue
 B. A. Mohideen - Minister for Small Scale Industries, Minister for Higher Education
 P. G. R. Sindhia, Minister of Transport, Home
 M. C. Naniah - Minister for Law
 C. Byre Gowda - Minister for Agriculture
 G Basavannappa - Food and Civil Supplies Minister
 H. D. Revanna, Minister of Housing (sacked on 22 July 1999)
 Umesh Katti - Minister for Sugar
 Vimalabai Deshmukh - Minister for Women and Child Welfare (1998-1999)
K. N. Nage Gowda - Major Irrigation
M. P. Prakash - Panchayati Raj
H. G. Govinde Gowda - Primary and Secondary Education
B. L. Shankar - Industries (From Feb 1999)
B. Somashekar - Minister for Revenue (1999)
 Shankar Naik
 B.B. Ningaiah (1998-99)
S. R. Lakshmaiah
K. M. Krishnamurthy

Ministers of State
 M. P. Prakash
 Leeladevi R. Prasad
 D.Nagarajaiah - sericulture minister  
 K. N. Nage Gowda
 B. N. Bacche Gowda
 V. Somanna - Minister for Bengaluru development, Minister for Prisons
 A. B. Patil
 H. Nagappa - Minister for Agricultural Marketing
 Anant Nag - Bangalore development
 R. Roshan Baig - Tourism, Home, Wakf, Bangalore development and Small scale industries

Former members
 R. V. Deshpande, Minister of Heavy industries till 2 February 1998
 K. B. Shanappa, Minister of Excise till 2 February 1998
 B. Somashekar - Minister for Higher Education till 2 February 1998 from April 1998, Minister of Forests
 S. D. Jayaram - Minister of Geology (Died in February 1998)
 Ajaykumar Sarnaik - Minister of State for Sports and Youth Affairs till elected to 11th LokSabha (Feb 1998)
 Ramesh Jigajinagi - Minister Revenue  till elected to 11th LokSabha (Feb 1998)
 Merajuddin Patel - Minister for Municipal Administration (1996-1997)
 B. T. Lalitha Naik - Minister for Women and Child Welfare (1996-1998)

See also
 Politics of Karnataka

References

Cabinets established in 1996
1996 establishments in Karnataka
Patel
1999 disestablishments in India
Janata Dal state ministries
Cabinets disestablished in 1999
1996 in Indian politics